Oromasiphya is a genus of parasitic flies in the family Tachinidae. There are at least two described species in Oromasiphya.

Species
These two species belong to the genus Oromasiphya:
 Oromasiphya ornata Townsend, 1927
 Oromasiphya urbanae Guimaraes, 1966

References

Further reading

 
 
 
 

Tachinidae
Articles created by Qbugbot